Gavmir, also rendered Gamir, may refer to:

Gavmir, Khuzestan, Iran

See also
Gavmiri, Iran